Definitive Collection is a compilation album by Europe, released on 30 April 1997 by Sony Music.

Track listing

Disc one
"The Final Countdown" (Tempest)
"Rock the Night" (Tempest)
"Carrie" (Tempest, Michaeli)
"Cherokee" (Tempest)
"Time Has Come" (Tempest)
"Heart of Stone" (Tempest)
"Love Chaser" (Tempest)
"On Broken Wings" (Tempest)
"Superstitious" (Tempest)
"Open Your Heart" [original version] (Tempest)
"Let the Good Times Rock" (Tempest)
"Sign of the Times" (Tempest)
"Tomorrow" (Tempest)
"Prisoners in Paradise" (Tempest)
"I'll Cry for You" (Tempest, Graham)
"Halfway to Heaven" (Tempest, Vallance)
"Break Free" (Tempest, Marcello)
"Sweet Love Child" (Tempest, Marcello, Michaeli)

Disc two
"In the Future to Come" (Tempest)
"Seven Doors Hotel" (Tempest)
"Stormwind" (Tempest)
"Scream of Anger" (Tempest, Jacob)
"Dreamer" (Tempest)

Personnel
Joey Tempest - vocals, acoustic guitar, keyboards
John Norum - guitar, backing vocals
Kee Marcello - guitar, backing vocals
John Levén - bass guitar
Mic Michaeli - keyboards, backing vocals
Tony Reno - drums
Ian Haugland - drums, backing vocals

References

Europe (band) compilation albums
1997 greatest hits albums
Epic Records compilation albums